The Commercial Spaceflight Federation is a private spaceflight industry group, incorporated as an industry association for the purposes of establishing ever higher levels of safety for the commercial human spaceflight industry, sharing best practices and expertise, and promoting the growth of the industry worldwide.  Issues that the Commercial Spaceflight Federation work on include, but are not limited to, airspace issues, FAA regulations and permits, industry safety standards, public outreach, and public advocacy for the commercial space sector.

History
In 2005, Peter Diamandis and John Gedmark from the X Prize Foundation convened a group of leaders in the emerging personal spaceflight industry, held at SpaceX's headquarters in El Segundo, California. Attendees at the meeting included SpaceX CEO Elon Musk, Virgin Galactic's Alex Tai, aviation pioneer Burt Rutan, businessman Robert Bigelow, and entrepreneur John Carmack. The goal of what was then called the Personal Spaceflight Federation was to "design and uphold the standards and processes necessary to ensure public safety and promote growth of the personal spaceflight industry."

On August 22, 2006, the PSF laid out their priorities as:
Member Coordination
Government Interface
Both with Congress and other federal agencies in order "to develop a legal and regulatory environment supportive of the growth of the human spaceflight industry."
Safety in spaceport operations, crew and passenger training, and vehicle manufacture, operations, and maintenance
Safety was highlighted as the most important concern for the PSF because safety was the common link between all the member companies
Insurance
Public Relations

On June 15, 2008, the Personal Spaceflight Federation announced a new website and a new name—the Commercial Spaceflight Federation—to emphasize "the diverse business activities of the commercial human spaceflight industry."  The areas the CSF now represented include:
Cargo and crew to the International Space Station
Flight of private individuals (space tourism)
Science Research Missions
Technology Research and Development
Astronaut training
Education and Outreach Activities
National Security Applications

On August 10, 2009, the CSF announced the creation of the Suborbital Applications Research Group (SARG). On February 18, 2010, the CSF announced a new research and education affiliates program.

United Launch Alliance joined in 2010, followed by Boeing's membership in 2013, but both left by 2014. The X Prize Foundation left by around 2016.

Lobbying efforts 

 The Commercial Spaceflight Federation lobbied for passage of the 2015 Commercial Space Bill.
 Former Commercial Spaceflight Federation President Eric Stallmer testified before the Senate Subcommittee on Science, Space, and Competitiveness on February 24, 2015
 Former CSF President Eric Stallmer testified alongside Elliot Pullham, CEO of the Space Foundation at a House Science, Space and Technology hearing on April 19, 2016
 CSF opposed the sale of excess ICBMs for use in space launch.
 Eric Stallmer testified for the House's Science, Space, and Technology Subcommittee in a hearing entitled "The ISS After 2024: Options and Impacts." on March 22, 2017 
 The Commercial Spaceflight Federation hosted a cocktail party for members of the National Space Council, including Vice President Pence, in February 2018.
 A week before the 50th anniversary of Apollo 11, Eric Stallmer testified before the Senate Commerce, Science, and Transportation Committee with Apollo 11 & 13 flight director Gene Kranz, former NASA engineer and author of Rocket Boys, Homer Hickam, former NASA mathematician Christine Darden, and CEO of the Coalition for Deep Space Exploration Mary Lynne Dittmar on July 9, 2019 
 Eric Stallmer testified before the House Science, Space, and Technology Subcommittee in a hearing on NASA's ISS plans on July 10, 2019

Committees 
The Commercial Spaceflight Federation has seven committees composed of their members and staff that are working to address the most pressing issues facing the industry. Participation in these committees is open to Executive and Associate members.

Export Control 
Within CSF's Export Control Committee, members work with industry experts from a variety of government agencies (including The Departments of State and Commerce) to promote modernization of Export Control policy and procedures in regards to the commercial space industry. The committee aims to assist American companies to remain competitive leaders in the global market and to advance innovation and technology overall. The committee also serves as a point of reference for adherence to current legislation and policy.

Government Funding 
The Government Funding Committee works to secure funding for the major governmental space agencies, NASA and FAA's Office of Commercial Space Transportation (AST). They monitor the budget requests of these agencies and work with legislative and executive contacts to ensure lack of funding does not impede advancement of the commercial space sector.

Regulatory 
CSF's Regulatory Committee collaborates to prepare information for and present a united position to legislative, executive and regulatory agencies. The committee works to get legislation passed that will benefit the space industry.

Industry Standards 
With the help of experienced aerospace professionals and standards development organizations, the members of the Industry Standards Committee work together to research and design industry consensus safety standards. These standards ensure the safety of spaceflight participants, provide the FAA with means of compliance, and can be used in the future to assist in creating regulations.

Space Commerce 
The Space Commerce Committee serves as the industry point of contact for legislative agencies. When issues arise that affect space commerce, such as the legal framework for resources mined from asteroids, the members author reports that agencies can use to prepare appropriate legislation.

Spaceports 
The Commercial Spaceflight Federation's Spaceports Committee focuses on a wide variety of issues facing the spaceport community including environmental, infrastructure, and regulatory topics.

Small Sats 
The Small Sats Committee identifies and proposes consensus solutions to address potential issues that could hamper the commercial space industry's growth. The committee focuses on multiple topics including regulations, licensing, permitting, sector outreach and promotion, and more.

Membership
CSF members are responsible for the creation of thousands of high-tech jobs. Members are over 80 industry organizations involved in commercial spaceflight and  private spaceflight, often referred to as new space.

There are four tiers of CSF membership, with each having different requirements and perks. The highest tier is Executive Membership, which is generally reserved for commercial spaceflight developers, operators, and spaceports. Below Executive members are Associate Members, which is composed of suppliers supporting commercial spaceflight, with recent members including suppliers of mission support services and suppliers of training, medical and life-support products and services. The third tier of membership is called Research and Education Affiliates (REM for short), and this tier is occupied by Universities, educational and student nonprofits, and other research and education institutions. The fourth tier of CSF membership is the Patrons Program. This tier is distinct from the rest in the sense that it is composed of individuals rather than corporate entities.

Executive Members 
Executive Membership is the highest level of membership offered at the Commercial Spaceflight Federation. At this level, members have an exclusive seat on the CSF Board of Directors.

Current List of Executive Members 
(Updated January 12, 2021):

 ABL Space Systems
 Arizona State University
 Axiom Space
 Blue Origin
 BRPH
 Cecil Field Spaceport (Jacksonville)
 Deloitte
 ISS National Laboratory
 Masten Space Systems
 Maxar Technologies
 Midland International Air & Space Port
 Mojave Air & Space Port
 Planet Labs
 Qwaltec
 Relativity Space
 Sierra Nevada Corporation
 Southwest Research Institute
 Space Florida
 Space Perspective
 Spaceport America
 Spaceport Camden
 SpaceX
 Virgin Galactic
 Virginia Commercial Space Flight Authority
 World View Enterprises

Associate Members 
The second highest tier, Associate members are invited to participate on the seven CSF committees: Export Control, Government Funding, Regulatory, Space Commerce, Spaceports, Standards, and Small Satellites.

Current List of Associate Members 
(Updated January 12, 2021):

 Advanced Space
 AGI (Analytical Graphics, Inc.)
 Alaska Aerospace Corporation
 Analytical Space
 AST & Science
 Astranis Space Technologies
 Atomos Space
 Barrios Technology
 Colorado Air & Space Port
 EnerSys
 Ground Based Space Matters
 Heinlein Prize Trust
 HelicitySpace Corp
 Houston Airport System
 ISPCS
 Johns Hopkins University Applied Physics Laboratory
 Kearney
 Kimley-Horn
 Launch on Demand 
 Made In Space
 Marotta
 MLA Space
 Momentus Space
 Moon Express
 NanoRacks
 Parabilis Space Technologies
 Rob Baker & Associates
 Rocket Lab
 RS&H
 Solstar
 Space Adventures
 Space Angels
 Space Tango
 Spaceflight Industries
 SpinLaunch
 Spire
 Techshot
 Tip Technologies
 University of Colorado Boulder – Smead Aerospace Engineering Sciences
 Voyager Space Holdings 
 Whitney, Bradley, and Brown
 Xplore

Research and Education Affiliates 
The Research and Education Affiliates is primarily for "Researchers, engineers, and educators."

Current list of research and education affiliates  
(Updated January 12, 2021):

 American Society for Gravitational and Space Research
 Association of Spaceflight Professionals
 Florida Institute of Technology
 The Museum of Flight
High Speed Flight
 National Institute for Aviation Research
 New Mexico Institute of Mining and Technology
 New Mexico State University
 Purdue University
 Silicon Valley Space Center
 Sovaris Aerospace, LLC
 STARS at Carnegie Mellon
 University of Arizona
 The University of Mississippi School of Law
 University of North Dakota
 University of Texas Medical Branch

Patrons Program 
The Patron Program is unique in that it allows for individual membership, unlike other membership categories, which are reserved for corporations, and organizations.

Suborbital Applications Researchers Group
The Suborbital Applications Researchers Group (SARG) was created on August 10, 2009 to "increase awareness of commercial suborbital vehicles in the science and R&D communities, to work with policymakers to ensure that payloads can have easy access to these vehicles, and to further develop ideas for the uses of these vehicles for science, engineering, and education missions."

See also 
 NewSpace

References

External links 
 Commercial Spaceflight Federation Website

Space organizations
Commercial spaceflight
Private spaceflight
Aviation trade associations